Emmelina buscki is a moth of the family Pterophoridae first described by William Barnes and Arthur Ward Lindsey in 1921. It is found in North America. 

The wingspan is 20–21 mm. Adults are tawny or brownish white, the abdomen with a slight brown dorsal stripe and some brown scales on the sides and below. The forewings are whitish tawny with scattered brown scales forming a dot in the cell and a dash before the cleft which projects toward a costal spot beyond the base of the cleft. The fringes are gray brown. The hindwings and fringes are gray brown. Adults are on wing in February, August, September and December.

The larvae feed on Ipomoea indica. They skeletonize the young leaves of their host plant.

References

Moths described in 1921
Oidaematophorini